Aqualand is a chain of water-amusement parks operated by Spanish tourism group Aspro Ocio S.A. It is the largest such group operating in Europe.

Overall there are five Aqualands in Spain and one in Portugal, eight in France and one in the Netherlands. Aspro Ocio also owns a number of other differently branded properties including Las Águilas Jungle Park on Tenerife.

Spain
Aqualand Costa Adeje, Tenerife 
Aqualand Bahía de Cadiz, Andalucia 
Aqualand el Arenal, Mallorca
Aqualand Torremolinos, Malaga (province)
Aqualand Maspalomas, Gran Canaria

Portugal
Aqualand Algarve

France
Aqualand Agen
Aqualand Bassin D'Arcachon
Aqualand Saint Cyprien
Aqualand Cap d'Agde
Aqualand Saint-Cyr-sur-Mer
Aqualand Frèjus
Aqualand Sainte Maxime
Aqualand Port Leucate

Netherlands
Aqualand Harderwijk

References

External links
 
 About Aspro Ocio
 Waterpark Portugal - Aqualand
 El Almanaque de Turismo - Aspro Ocio
 Aqualand Algarve Portugal on Algarve Guidebook
 Aqualand Costa Adeje Tenerife. Dolphinarium: Full details of the park, photo gallery, curiosities, location, etc.

Water parks
Amusement parks in France
Amusement parks in Portugal
Water parks in Spain
Aspro Parks attractions